The Last Resort is a documentary film about Miami Beach directed by Dennis Scholl and Kareem Tabsch. It features photographs taken between 1976 and 1986 by photographers Andy Sweet and Gary Monroe.

The film focuses on the transformation of South Beach between the 1960s and 1980s. In the 1960s South Beach was an inexpensive retirement community, populated largely by working and lower middle class Jewish retirees. By the early 1980s the housing was deteriorating, and, in the wake of the Mariel boatlift and the Miami Drug War South Beach became a dangerous neighborhood.

Context and commentary are provided by interviews with Susan Gladstone, Director of the Jewish Museum of Florida, filmmaker Kelly Reichardt, who grew up in South Beach, and Edna Buchanan, a crime novelist who grew up in Miami Beach and covered crime for Miami newspapers in the period documented by Monroe and Sweet.

Reception
On Metacritic, the film have an above average score of 76 out of 100 based on 6 critics, indicating "generally favorable reviews".

The film was called "Poignantly nostalgic" by Frank Scheck of The Hollywood Reporter.

References

External links
Daily Poetry Dose, 'The Last Resort' WNYC

2018 films
2018 documentary films
American documentary films
American independent films
Documentary films about Jews and Judaism in the United States
2018 independent films
2010s English-language films
2010s American films